Snes9x is a Super Nintendo Entertainment System emulator with official ports for MS-DOS, Linux, Microsoft Windows, AmigaOS 4, macOS, MorphOS, Xbox, PSP, PS3, GameCube, Wii, iOS, and Android. Windows RT and Windows Phone 8 have an unofficial port named Snes8x.

Background

Development of Snes9x began in July 1997 when Snes96's Gary Henderson and Snes97's Jerremy Koot merged their respective emulators to create Snes9x.  Snes9x was among the first to emulate most SNES enhancement chips at some level. In version 1.53, it added support for Cg shaders. Version 1.55 added support for the MSU1 enhancement chip  found on the SD2SNES 

The emulator PocketSNES for Pocket PCs is based on Snes9X.

There is also an unofficial Snes9x port compiled with Emscripten which runs inside a web browser.

License 

The source code of Snes9x is publicly available, but the license prohibits its commercial use.

Reception

In 2005, Retro Gamer called Snes9x "the best SNES emulator available".

In 2021, Digital Trends noted that the emulator had broad compatibility and ran on systems with limited resources.

See also 

 List of SNES emulators

References

Further reading

External links 

 

Amiga emulation software
AmigaOS 4 software
Super Nintendo Entertainment System emulators
MacOS emulation software
Windows emulation software
Proprietary video game console emulators